Jonathan Freeman may refer to:

Jonathan Freeman (actor) (born 1950), Tony-nominated American actor known for voicing the villainous Jafar in Disney's Aladdin
Jonathan Freeman (representative) (1745–1808), United States Representative from New Hampshire
Jonathan Freeman-Attwood, Principal of the Royal Academy of Music in London, United Kingdom
Jonathan Freeman (cinematographer), Canadian cinematographer working primarily in America
Jonathan Freeman (footballer) (born 1994), Australian rules footballer for Brisbane Lions

See also
Jon Freeman, computer game industry figure
Jonny Freeman, British actor and comedian
John Freeman (disambiguation)